is a railway station on the Sekisho Line in Yūbari, Hokkaido, Japan, operated by Hokkaido Railway Company (JR Hokkaido).

Lines
Takinoue Station is served by the Sekisho Line, and is situated 27.0 km from the starting point of the line at Minami-Chitose Station. The station is numbered "K18".

Station layout
The station has one side platform and one island platform connected by a footbridge, serving three tracks. Kitaca is not available. The station is unattended.

History
The station opened on 16 February 1897. With the privatization of Japanese National Railways (JNR) on 1 April 1987, the station came under the control of JR Hokkaido.

See also
 List of railway stations in Japan

References

Railway stations in Hokkaido Prefecture
Stations of Hokkaido Railway Company
Railway stations in Japan opened in 1897